The 2018 season of the Indian Premier League, also known as IPL 11, was the eleventh season of the IPL, a professional Twenty20 cricket league established by the BCCI in 2007. The season, which was held from 7 April to 27 May, saw the return of the Chennai Super Kings and the Rajasthan Royals after serving two years of suspension for the involvement of their respective owners in the 2013 IPL betting case. Star Sports purchased the media rights at ₹16,347.5 crore ($2.55 billion) for five years starting from 2018. The tagline was Best vs Best.

Chennai Super Kings won by 8 wickets against Sunrisers Hyderabad in the final to win their third title. Sunrisers Hyderabad captain Kane Williamson won the Orange Cap for the leading run-scorer of the tournament with 735 runs. Andrew Tye, of Kings XI Punjab, was awarded the Purple Cap for finishing as the leading wicket-taker of the tournament with 24 wickets. Sunil Narine of Kolkata Knight Riders was named Most Valuable Player, also known as Man of the Series, while Rishabh Pant of Delhi Daredevils was named the Emerging Player of the Series.

Background 
This was the first season of the IPL to use DRS. IPL Fanpark, an initiative where matches are hosted in stadia on a large screen has been planned to be held across 36 cities in 19 states across the India. This season also introduced mid-season transfers. The transfer window will be a short five-day transfer window applicable only for uncapped players who have played not more than two matches at the halfway mark of the tournament.

Format 
Eight teams were scheduled to play in 2018. The tournament involved each team playing every other team twice in a home-and-away, double round-robin format. At the conclusion of the double round-robin league, the top four teams on the basis of aggregate points qualified for the playoffs. In this stage, the top two teams compete with each other (in a match titled "Qualifier 1"), as do the remaining two teams (in a match titled "Eliminator"). While the winner of Qualifier 1 directly qualified for the final match, the losing team got another chance to qualify for the final match by playing the winning team of the Eliminator match; this match is titled Qualifier 2. The winner of this subsequent Qualifier 2 match moved onto the final match. The team that won the final match was crowned the Indian Premier League winners. The schedule for the tournament was published on 14 February 2018.

Broadcast 
Star Sports won the global media rights at ₹16,347.5 crore ($2.55 billion) for five years starting from 2018. In India, the tournament will be broadcast on Star Network channels in six languages (English, Hindi, Tamil, Telugu, Kannada and Bengali). For the first time, IPL would also be broadcast on public broadcaster Doordarshan. The television rights for rest of the world were won by Willow TV for US and Canada, Sky Sports for UK, Fox Sports for Australia, Sky Sport for New Zealand, SuperSport for sub Saharan Africa, beIN Sports for Middle-East and North America, Flow TV for Caribbean, Geo Super for Pakistan, Channel 9 for Bangladesh and Lemar TV for Afghanistan. The radio rights were won by Cricket Radio globally (except Indian subcontinent), 89.1 Radio 4 FM and Gold 101.3 FM for US and Talksport for UK. Star's digital platform Hotstar held the digital rights for India, US and Canada. The digital rights for rest of the world were won by Sky Sports for UK, Fox Sports for Australia, Sky Sport for New Zealand, SuperSport for sub Saharan Africa, beIN Sports for Middle-East and North America, Flow TV for Caribbean, Geo Super for Pakistan, Channel 9 for Bangladesh and YuppTV for Australia, Europe, SE Asia & South America. Star India also announced its plan to broadcast IPL in Virtual Reality.

Venues 
Per the original schedule, all teams except for Kings XI Punjab, would play their home games at their traditional home venues. Kings XI were scheduled to play three of their home games in Indore and the other four games in Mohali. The schedule was later changed due to logistical issues owing to the temporary closure of Chandigarh Airport, and as a result, Kings XI would play three of their home games in Mohali and the other four games in Indore making an exception to the rule of playing at least four home matches at their designated home venue. The IPL matches in Chennai were threatened due to the Kaveri water dispute protests. The Madras High Court issued a notice to BCCI after a PIL was filed seeking a stay on the IPL matches in Chennai. On 11 April that Chennai's six remaining home matches would be held in Pune instead due to security concerns resulting from the protests.

Ten venues were selected to host the matches. The opening match and the final will be played at the Wankhede Stadium in Mumbai. The venues for the two playoffs were not announced initially due to the norm of allotting the Eliminator and second qualifier to the home stadium of last season's runner-up, and the fact that the 2017 runner-up, Rising Pune Supergiant were no longer a part of the IPL. Later, both playoffs were allotted to Pune but after the venue of Chennai Super Kings was moved there, the matches were shifted to Kolkata.

Personnel changes 

The IPL Governing Council announced that each IPL franchise could retain a maximum of five players from their respective current squads. Of the five players, a franchise could retain a maximum of three players through retention in lead up to the auction, and a maximum of three players through right-to-match card during the auction. The other restrictions on player retention were: a maximum of three capped Indian players could be retained, and only two overseas players and two uncapped Indian players could be retained. The salary cap for each team for the 2018 season was increased from ₹66 crore to ₹80 crore (approximately $12.4 million). A franchise was allowed to spend only ₹33 crore on retentions ahead of the 2018 IPL auction, leaving it at least ₹47 crore to spend at the auction.

IPL teams were asked to submit their retention list by 4 January. For the first time in IPL history, the player retention event was broadcast live on Star Sports. The IPL auction was held on 27 and 28 January at Bangalore a day after the final of the Syed Mushtaq Ali Trophy.
169 players (104 Indians and 56 Overseas) were sold at auction. Ben Stokes fetched the highest bid of ₹12.5 crore (US$1.95 million). Jaydev Unadkat was the most costly Indian player at ₹11.5 crore (US$1.80 million). Among uncapped players Krunal Pandya was most expensive at ₹8.8 crore(US$1.38 million). Many prominent players such as Lasith Malinga, Dale Steyn, Ishant Sharma, Hashim Amla , Martin Guptill and Joe Root remain unsold.

Opening ceremony
The season had a single opening ceremony, unlike 2017 IPL, before the first match on 7 April. The ceremony included performances by Varun Dhawan, Prabhu Deva, Mika Singh, Tamannaah Bhatia, Jacqueline Fernandez and Hrithik Roshan.

Teams and standings

Points table 

("C" refers to the "Champions" of the Tournament. '2', '3' and '4' are the positions of the respective teams in the tournament.)

Match summary

League stage

Match results

Playoffs

Preliminary 

Qualifier 1

Eliminator

Qualifier 2

Final

Statistics

Most Runs 

  Kane Williamson of Sunrisers Hyderabad received the Orange Cap.
 Source: ESPNcricinfo

Most wickets 

  Andrew Tye of Kings XI Punjab received the Purple Cap.
 Source: ESPNcricinfo

Special awards

 Source:

See also 
 2018 Women's T20 Challenge
 List of Indian Premier League records and statistics

References

External links 
 Series home on ESPN Cricinfo

Indian Premier League seasons
Domestic cricket competitions in 2017–18
2018 Indian Premier League